is a Japanese manga written and illustrated by Mikiyo Tsuda. The series was serialized in Shinshokan's manga magazine South between April 1998 and February 2001. The manga is licensed in English by Digital Manga Publishing and has been released in North America in 2006. Two drama CDs based on the series were produced, the first in July 2001 and the second in March 2002. The story mainly focuses around a boy who starts to live as a girl and how his group of friends changes due to his new lifestyle.

Plot
The Day of Revolution revolves around Kei Yoshikawa, a boy in high school who one day is informed that he is genetically female. This shocking realization causes his family to grow closer together and Kei decides that he is going to restart his life as a girl named Megumi. Megumi takes a six-month leave from school and returns as a first-year student with Makoto Yutaka, the niece of the doctor who aided in Kei's transition; Makoto also helps Megumi adjust to living life as a girl. Megumi is quickly found out by her old male friends who all start hitting on her once they discover the truth that she was Kei. Shocked at their new behavior, Megumi is appalled at the thought of ever dating any one of them or even getting a boyfriend. After a traumatic experience with a former enemy, she tells her friends that she has chosen Makoto instead of any of them, though they do not back down in their pursuits.

Megumi, in an attempt to avoid her persistent male friends, starts spending more time at Makoto's house where she meets her younger brother Mikoto, who is home during the summer from an all-boys boarding school. Megumi starts to become more fond of Mikoto, though still only thinks of him as a younger brother, while at the same time Mikoto harbors feelings for Megumi. Megumi and Mikoto go on a date together but are interrupted by Megumi's male friends and Makoto. Megumi attempts to protect Mikoto from her friends' teasing of him, and in the process causes Mikoto to confess his love to her. Megumi and Mikoto begin dating though are still constantly interrupted and are thus unable to progress their relationship very far even two years later. However, they resolve to make progress together.

Characters

The main character, Kei was a rebellious boy in high school who would get into fights along with his three close friends. However, one day his doctor tells him and his parents that while Kei may appear to be physically male, he is in fact genetically female. He thus starts to live as a girl and even changes his name to Megumi, which uses the same kanji as 'Kei'. After the change in lifestyle, Megumi still has a problem with the transition from male to female. Even as Megumi dresses as a girl, she still feels more like a boy, and feels more comfortable when around Makoto. As a guy, he was often told he was cute, causing him to physically retaliate and retains much of the same personality after his transition. Megumi tends to be very outspoken and even blunt sometimes.
Megumi appears in the series Princess Princess, by the same author of The Day of Revolution, as Mikoto's girlfriend, though only references are made about her past life in the manga and nothing in the anime. In the manga, Megumi once fears that Mikoto had something with the other Princesses and that the only reason he is interested in her is because of her past life.

Makoto is Megumi's best female friend who acts as a kind of coach to guide her through the process of becoming a typical girl. She teaches Megumi things such as feminine mannerisms, and speech patterns that only Japanese girls use. She was given this task because she is the niece to Kei's doctor and because she wants to become a counselor after high school. Makoto is very protective of Megumi, not wanting anything bad to happen to her. She has a very strong personality and uses it to command people around her however she likes. Makoto often uses this trait to coerce her younger brother, Mikoto, into doing things she wants him to do, whether they be for her own benefit or his own.
Like Megumi, Makoto also appears in the series Princess Princess as a minor character; she is still portrayed as Mikoto's sister. In the Princess Princess manga, once Megumi tells Makoto about her insecurities regarding Mikoto's sexual orientation, Makoto tells Megumi not to let him know that. Megumi thinks it is because it would hurt his feelings, but Makoto says that she does not want him to know how much Megumi loves him because it would make him happier.

Mikoto is Makoto's younger brother who later becomes Megumi's boyfriend. He is a rather short guy who is in his second year at an all-boys junior high school. He is usually a very shy person but speaks out with much emotion. Ever since he entered junior high, he has been plagued by other students who treat him more like a girl than a guy due to his appearance and feminine face and is intensely embarrassed about this happening to him. He takes an early liking to Megumi by the pictures of her that are displayed at his house. Mikoto even takes a few of the pictures for himself, something his sister reminds him about later to the embarrassment of Mikoto. Eventually, he wants to become a doctor and take over the family hospital.
Mikoto appears in Mikiyo Tsuda's later work Princess Princess as one of the series' main characters and Princesses. The main reason he expresses to object being a Princess (aside from male pride) is the fear that Megumi will reject him if she finds out.

Hiroaki Kawada is a former classmate of Kei's who eventually becomes the student council president. He has a lot of traits that fit well for a school president, such as forcefulness and being straightforward.

Shuji Toba has a very lively personality and is one of Megumi's main friends. Back when Megumi was Kei, he would love to hug her, much to the detest of Kei.

Tadashi Tachimachi is also one of Megumi's close friends; he is usually very silent. He is also rather short, only a few centimeters taller than Megumi.

Kazutoshi Shinmei is one of Megumi's friends that she knew as Kei. He constantly smiles and is shown to be the leader of Toba and Tachimachi. He can be very domineering and intimidating at times.

Taisei Nakagawa is a third-year student at the school who is at odds with Shinmei, Toba, Tachimachi and Kei since they took over the roof position at the top of the school. He is rather idiotic and does not always think up the best of plans on how to go about things. Also, he is the main reason Megumi starts to avoid guys after he assaults her one day.
 & 
They are twin brothers who serve as the voice of reason for the otherwise idiotic Nakagawa. They always hang around with him and follow him as their leader.

Media

Manga
The manga series The Day of Revolution is written and illustrated by Mikiyo Tsuda and was first serialized in Shinshokan's manga magazine South between April 1998 and February 2001. Two bound volumes were released in Japan, the first in March 1999 and the second in May 2001. The series is licensed in English by Digital Manga Publishing, with the first volume released on September 20, 2006 and the second volume released on December 13, 2006. It has also been published in Germany by Egmont Manga & Anime and in France by Kazé. The additional kanji  was added to the beginning of the Japanese version of the second volume. Tsuda wrote in the second volume that she had intended the story to be complete after the first volume, but was persuaded by a good friend and fellow manga author Eiki Eiki that the story had not been satisfactorily ended, and needed a more conclusive resolution.

Drama CDs
Two drama CDs based on the manga were published by Shinshokan in Japan. The first was released on July 28, 2001, and the second was released on March 15, 2002.

References

External links
The Day of Revolution at Digital Manga Publishing

Digital Manga Publishing titles
Mikiyo Tsuda
Shinshokan manga
Shōjo manga
Transgender in anime and manga